Fozizhuang Township is a township situated in northern part of Fangshan District, Beijing, China. It shares border with Datai Subdistrict and Yongding Town in the north; Tanzhesi, Hebei Towns and Xiangyang Subdistrict in the east; Zhoukoudian Town, Nanjiao and Xiayunling Townships in the south; Shijiaying and Da'anshan Townships in the west. As of 2020, its census population was 6,183.

This area first became a village during the Yuan dynasty. The name Fozizhuang was given for the buddha statue on village gate when it was founded.

History

Administrative Divisions 

As of 2021, Fozizhuang Township consisted of 18 villages:

Gallery

See also 
 List of township-level divisions of Beijing

References 

Fangshan District
Township-level divisions of Beijing